The French Agricultural Research Centre for International Development (CIRAD) is a French agricultural research and international cooperation organization working for the sustainable development of tropical and Mediterranean regions. It is a public industrial and commercial establishment (EPIC) founded in 1984, with its Head Office in Paris.

In France, CIRAD has two research centres, one in Montpellier (Lavalette campus) and the other in nearby Montferrier-sur-Lez (Baillarguet campus, which has an ecotron, amongst other facilities) and research stations in the French overseas regions. Through its twelve regional offices spread over every continent, CIRAD works with more than 100 countries.

History 
CIRAD was founded in 1984 from nine tropical research institutes, most dating back to the 1940s.

The institutes were primarily non-profit-making organizations, each working to promote a specific production chain. They joined forces in 1958 to form a liaison committee specializing in the French overseas regions, before merging in 1970 to form the Groupement d'étude et de recherche pour le développement de l'agronomie tropicale (GERDAT), the direct predecessor to CIRAD.

Original institutes:

 Institut de recherches pour les huiles et oléagineux (IRHO);
 Institut de recherches sur les fruits et agrumes (IRFA);
 Institut de recherches sur le caoutchouc (IRCA);
 Institut d'élevage et de médecine vétérinaire des pays tropicaux (IEMVT);
 Centre technique forestier tropical (CTFT);
 Institut de Recherches du Coton et des Textiles Exotiques (IRCT);
 Institut français du café, du cacao et autres plantes stimulantes (IFCC);
 Institut de recherches agronomiques tropicales et des cultures vivrières (IRAT);
 Centre d'études et d'expérimentation du machinisme agricole tropical (CEEMAT).

Mandate 
CIRAD's main task is to contribute to rural development in tropical and subtropical countries through research activities, experimentation, training (in France and overseas) and the dissemination of scientific and technical information.
It works with more than 100 countries in Africa, Asia, the Pacific, Latin America and Europe. Its operations are conducted at its own centres and those belonging to national agricultural research systems in its partner countries. CIRAD makes its scientific and institutional expertise available to fuel public policy in those countries and the global debate on the main issues surrounding agriculture. It also supports French scientific diplomacy.

Human, material and financial resources 
CIRAD has a staff of 1650 (including 856 researchers).

Its annual operating budget totals 200 million euros, two thirds of which is covered by the State research and technological development budget (BCRD) and the remainder by contractual resources.

Main CIRAD activities in Montpellier 
 Research in interaction with field projects. The Montpellier centre provides scientific methods (genome analysis, crop improvement), techniques (in vitro culture, molecular biology, mineral analyses) and tools (databases, statistics).
 Services to researchers and farmers in warm regions (tropical disease identification, choice of control methods, varietal breeding, wood analyses, foodstuffs).
 Expertise: project design and assessment, and national and international agricultural research policy support.
 Training: the centre receives more than 800 researchers and technicians each year.
 Scientific and technical information: publishing journals, books and CD-ROMs.

Organization

Scientific departements 
CIRAD has three scientific departments:
 Biological Systems (BIOS)
 Performance of Tropical Production and Processing Systems (PERSYST)
 Environment and Societies (ES).

It is split into 33 research units: nine internal research units (UPRs), 23 joint research units (UMRs) and a service unit (US).

Since 2006, its publishing operations have been under the banner of Editions Quae, which is based at INRA.

See also

Related articles 
 INRA
 Organisme public civil de recherche français
 Institut national de recherche en sciences et technologies pour l'environnement et l'agriculture (IRSTEA)
 Institut agronomique, vétérinaire et forestier de France (IAVFF)
 Institut des fruits et légumes coloniaux

External links 
 official CIRAD website
 Éditions Quæ
 Agritrop, the CIRAD open publications archive

Notes and references 

Organizations established in 1984
Organizations based in Paris
1984 establishments in France